Kevin Bleeker (born 10 May 1993) is a Dutch basketball player for the Den Helder Suns of the BNXT League. Formerly, he played for Holargos, Navarar and Heroes Den Bosch.

Early life
Bleeker first played for the junior teams of BV Noordkop in the Netherlands. He also played for various junior squads of the Dutch, including the U18 team that played on the European Championship in Bulgaria. He also played in the 16th annual Holland - Nordic Basketball Tournament in April 2011.

College career
Bleeker started his career with the Golden Griffins in the 2011–12 season. He played in 30 games and started 6 in his rookie year. He scored a career high 18 points against South Dakota on 18 December 2011. He opted to redshirt the 2012–13 season. In the next season, he contributed again, as he averaged 6.4 minutes per game.

Professional career
In June 2017, Bleeker signed a one-year contract with New Heroes Den Bosch of the Dutch Basketball League (DBL), with an option to a second year.LUCHTMACHT BIJNA COMPLEET MET KOMST BLEEKER

In 2018, Bleeker joined the Landstede Hammers and helped the team win the DBL championship in his first season.

In June 2022, he signed with Den Helder Suns, marking a return to Den Helder after 11 years.

International career
In 2014, Bleeker played his first games for the Dutch national basketball team in the FIBA EuroBasket 2015 qualification. He was part of the team that qualified for EuroBasket 2015, the country's first EuroBasket qualification since 25 years. Overall, Bleeker played in a total of 11 games for the Netherlands.

References

External links
Canisius profile

1993 births
Living people
Basket Navarra Club players
Canisius Golden Griffins men's basketball players
Centers (basketball)
Den Helder Suns players
Dutch expatriate basketball people in the United States
Dutch men's basketball players
Heroes Den Bosch players
Holargos B.C. players
Landstede Hammers players
Sportspeople from Alkmaar